The 2016 Bangladesh Premier League, also known as BPL 4 and AKS BPL 2016 (for sponsorship reasons) was the fourth season of the Bangladesh Premier League (BPL), the top level professional Twenty20 cricket franchise league in Bangladesh. The competition was organised by the Bangladesh Cricket Board (BCB) and featured seven teams. The season originally began on 4 November 2016 and ended on 9 December 2016. However, after the first four matches of the tournament were abandoned due to rain and with more rain forecast, the league opted to restart on 8 November and to replay all of the opening six matches.

Two new teams, Khulna Titans and Rajshahi Kings played in the competition with new ownership after the original franchises were not allowed to enter the 2015 competition, while the Sylhet Super Stars franchise was excluded from the competition. The BCB originally claimed that Sylhet had breached franchisee agreements or not paid bank guarantees, but on 21 September clarified that the franchise had been excluded for "disciplinary reasons". Comilla Victorians were the defending champions but were eliminated in the group stage. In the championship game, Dhaka Dynamites defeated Rajshahi Kings to win their third title.

Player draft
The 2016 BPL draft was held on 30 September. Prior to the draft, the seven clubs signed 38 foreign players to contracts and each existing franchise was able to retain two home-grown players from the 2015 season. A total 301 players participated in the draft, including 133 local and 168 foreign players. 85 players were selected in the draft.

Player transfers
Prior to the 2016 draft, a number of high-profile players moved teams. These included transfers between competing teams and due to the suspension of the Sylhet Super Stars and the introduction of two new teams, Khulna Titans and Rajshahi Kings. Transfers included the move of Barisal Bulls captain Mahmudullah Riyad to the Khulna Titans, Chris Gayle from the Barisal Bulls to the Chittagong Vikings, the signing of Shahid Afridi as team captain of Rangpur Riders from the Sylhet Super Stars and Shakib Al Hasan as team captain of Dhaka Dynamites from Rangpur Riders.

Venues 
A total of 46 matches, including the final, will be held at two venues in Chittagong and Dhaka. The Zohur Ahmed Chowdhury Stadium in Chittagong hosted eleven (11) matches in the middle block of games, with the majority of matches (35), including all playoff matches and the final being held at the Sher-e-Bangla National Cricket Stadium in Dhaka. 25,000 people attended the final.

Points table

 The top four teams will qualify for playoffs
  advanced to the Qualifier
  advanced to the Eliminator

League stage
A total of 46 matches was played in the tournament. During the round-robin group stage each team played 12 matches, two against each other team taking part in the tournament. In total 42 matches was played in the group stage, with the top four teams progressing to the playoff stage of the tournament which will feature three playoff matches and the final which was played on 9 December at the Sher-e-Bangla National Cricket Stadium in Dhaka.

Group stage matches was played in three blocks. The first and third blocks took place in Dhaka with the middle block of 10 matches taking place in Chittagong. Two matches was played on each day of the group stage part of the tournament. The first four matches of the tournament were washed out after heavy rain and the two matches scheduled to take place on 6 November were postponed. The tournament was restarted on 8 November with the first six fixtures to be rescheduled at a later date. The matches from the opening day of fixtures was replayed with the points table reset.

Rain-affected fixtures
The following six matches were all affected by rain, with only the first one technically starting with a toss taking place.  All of the results were removed from the points table and rescheduled for later in the tournament.

Phase 1

Phase 2

Phase 3

Playoffs

Eliminator

Qualifier 1

Qualifier 2

Final

Statistics

Most runs

Most wickets

Highest team totals
The following table lists the three highest team scores during this season.

See also
Rajshahi Kings in 2016
Khulna Titans in 2016  
Barisal Bulls in 2016
Comilla Victorians in 2016
Dhaka Dynamites in 2016
Rangpur Riders in 2016
Chittagong Vikings in 2016

References

External links
 Series home at ESPN Cricinfo

Domestic cricket competitions in 2016–17
2016 in Bangladeshi cricket
2017 in Bangladeshi cricket
2016-17